Japanese sword mountings are the various housings and associated fittings (tosogu) that hold the blade of a Japanese sword when it is being worn or stored.  refers to the ornate mountings of a Japanese sword (e.g. katana) used when the sword blade is being worn by its owner, whereas the shirasaya is a plain undecorated wooden mounting composed of a saya and tsuka that the sword blade is stored in when not being used.

Components 

: The fuchi is a hilt collar between the tsuka and the tsuba.
: The habaki is a wedge-shaped metal collar used to keep the sword from falling out of the saya and to support the fittings below; fitted at the ha-machi and mune-machi which precede the nakago.
: a hook shaped fitting used to lock the saya to the obi while drawing.
: The kashira is a butt cap (or pommel) on the end of the tsuka.
: The kōgai is a spike for hair arranging carried sometimes as part of katana-koshirae in another pocket.
: The koiguchi is the  mouth of the saya or its fitting; traditionally made of buffalo horn.
: The kojiri is the end of the saya or the protective fitting at the end of the saya; also traditionally made of buffalo horn.
: The kozuka is a decorative handle fitting for the kogatana; a small utility knife fit into a pocket on the saya.
: The kuri-kata is a knob on the side of the saya for attaching the sageo.
: The mekugi is a small peg for securing the tsuka to the nakago.
: The menuki are ornaments on the tsuka (generally under the tsuka-ito); Originally menuki were a cover for the mekugi to hold the peg/s in place. On Tachi worn edge down orientation at palm to orient the sword. On Katana orientation is at fingertips to orient the sword.
: The mekugi-ana are the holes in the tsuka and nakago for the mekugi.
: The sageo is the cord used to tie saya to the belt/obi when worn.
: literally the pattern of the ray skin.
: same-kawa is the ray or shark skin wrapping of the tsuka  (handle/hilt).
: The saya is a wooden scabbard for the blade; traditionally done in lacquered wood.
: The seppa are washers above and below the tsuba to tighten the fittings.
: an accent on the kurikata for aesthetic purposes; often done in gold-ish metal in modern reproductions.
: The tsuba is a hand guard.
: The tsuka is the hilt or handle; made of wood and wrapped in samegawa.
: the art of wrapping the tsuka, including the most common hineri maki and katate maki (battle wrap). There are also more elaborate and artistic wrapping techniques, like Jabara maki.
: Tsuka-ito the wrap of the tsuka, traditionally silk but today most often in cotton and sometimes leather

Shirasaya 
A , "white scabbard", is a plain wooden Japanese sword saya (scabbard) and tsuka (hilt), traditionally made of nurizaya wood and used when a blade was not expected to see use for some time and needed to be stored. They were externally featureless save for the needed mekugi-ana to secure the nakago (tang), though sometimes  (blade information) was also present. The need for specialized storage is because prolonged koshirae mounting harmed the blade, owing to factors such as the lacquered wood retaining moisture and encouraging corrosion.

Such mountings are not intended for actual combat, as the lack of a tsuba (guard) and proper handle wrappings were deleterious; as such they would likely never make their way onto a battlefield. However, there have been loosely similar "hidden" mountings, such as the shikomizue. Also, many blades dating back to earlier Japanese history are today sold in such a format, along with modern-day reproductions; while most are purely decorative replicas, a few have functional blades.

Shirasaya gallery

Koshirae 

The word koshirae is derived from the verb , which is no longer used in current speech. More commonly "tsukuru" is used in its place with both words meaning to "make, create, manufacture."

A koshirae should be presented with the tsuka (hilt) to the left, particularly in times of peace with the reason being that you cannot unsheathe the sword easily this way. During the Edo period, many formalized rules were put into place: in times of war the hilt should be presented to the right allowing the sword to be readily unsheathed.

Koshirae were meant not only for functional but also for aesthetic purposes, often using a family mon (crest) for identification.

Types of koshirae

Tachi

The tachi (太刀) style koshirae is the primary style of mounting used for the tachi, where the sword is suspended edge-down from two hangers (ashi) attached to the obi. The hilt often had a slightly stronger curvature than the blade, continuing the classic tachi increase in curvature going from the tip to the hilt.  The hilt was usually secured with two pegs (mekugi), as compared to one peg for shorter blades including katana. The tachi style koshirae preceded the katana style koshirae.

Katana

The katana (刀) style koshirae is the most commonly known koshirae and it is what is most associated with a samurai sword. Swords mounted in this manner are worn with the cutting edge up as opposed to the tachi mounting, in which the sword is worn with the cutting edge down.

Han-dachi (half tachi)
The han-dachi (半太刀) koshirae was worn katana-style but included some tachi related fittings such as a kabuto-gane instead of a kashira.

Aikuchi

The  is a form of koshirae for small swords in which the hilt and the scabbard meet without a crossguard between them.  The word literally means ai ("meeting") + kuchi ("mouth; opening"), in reference to the way the hilt fits directly against the scabbard.  Originally used on the koshigatana (a precursor to the wakizashi) to facilitate close wearing with armour, it became a fashionable upper-class mounting style for a tantō (literally, "small sword", nowadays regarded as a dagger) from the Kamakura period onwards.

Shikomizue
The  or jotō (杖刀, "staff sword") is a Japanese swordstick. It is most famous for its use by the fictional swordmaster Zatoichi.
The sword blade was placed in a cane-like mounting (tsue) as concealment. These mountings are not to be confused with the Shirasaya (白鞘, "white scabbard"), which were just plain wooden mountings with no decoration other than (sometimes) a short description of the contents.

Some shikomi-zue also concealed metsubushi, chains, hooks, and many other things.  Shikomi-zue could be carried in public without arousing suspicion, making them perfect tools for shinobi.

Kaiken
The kaiken (懐剣) is an 8–10 inch long, single- or double-edged dagger without ornamental fittings housed in a plain mount, formerly carried by men and women of the samurai class in Japan. It was useful for self-defense indoors where the long katana and intermediate wakizashi were inconvenient. Women carried them in their kimono either in a pocket like fold or in the sleeve  for self-defense or for suicide by means of slashing the jugular veins and carotid artery in the left side of the neck.

Koshirae gallery

Parts of the koshirae

Saya 
 is the Japanese term for a scabbard, and specifically refers to the scabbard for a sword or knife. The saya of a koshirae (scabbards for practical use) are normally manufactured from very lightweight wood, with a coat of lacquer on the exterior. Correct drawing and sheathing of the blade involves contacting the mune (the back of the blade) rather than ha (the edge) to the inside of the scabbard. Traditionally the koiguchi (the throat of the scabbard) and kojiri (the chape) were made from buffalo horn. 

The Saya is divided in parts:
  
There are a number of different methods for wrapping and tying the sageo on the saya for display purposes. Other uses for the sageo are tying the sword to the samurai and hojojutsu. The samurai felt the sageo formed a spiritual bond between them and the sword, and they were very particular about tying it correctly when the sword was not in use.

 Kuri-kata
The kurikata (栗形) is a knob that is attached to the scabbard of a Japanese sword. The sageo (cord) that secures the saya of the sword to the obi (belt) goes through a hole in the kurikata.

 Kojiri
The kojiri (鐺) is the end cap of the scabbard or the protective fitting at the end of the scabbard.

 Kogatana and kozuka
Kogatana (小刀), a small utility knife that fits into a pocket on the scabbard, the kozuka is the decorative handle for the kogatana.

 
The kōgai (笄) is a spike for hair arranging that fits into a pocket on the saya.

 
The umabari (馬針) is a small knife that is a variation of the kogatana, it fits into a pocket on the saya.

Tsuka 
The tsuka (柄) is the hilt or handle of a Japanese sword.

The tsuka is divided in the following parts:
 Menuki
The menuki (目貫) are ornaments on the tsuka (generally under the tsuka-ito); to fit into the palm for grip.

 
Samegawa (鮫皮) is the ray skin used to cover or wrap the handle.

 Tsuka-ito
Tsuka-ito (柄糸) is the wrapping of the tsuka, traditionally silk but today more often cotton and sometimes, leather.

 Fuchi
Fuchi (縁), a cap type collar or ferrule which covers the opening in the tsuka of a Japanese sword. The tang of the sword goes into the tsuka through the opening in the fuchi.

 
The kashira (頭) is the end cap (pommel) on the tsuka.

Tsuba 
The  is usually a round (or occasionally squarish) guard at the end of the grip of bladed Japanese weapons, like the katana and its variations, tachi, wakizashi, tantō,  naginata etc. They contribute to the balance of the weapon and to the protection of the hand. The tsuba was mostly meant to be used to prevent the hand from sliding onto the blade during thrusts as opposed to protecting from an opponent's blade. The chudan no kamae guard is determined by the tsuba and the curvature of the blade.

During the Muromachi period (1333–1573) and the Momoyama period (1573–1603) Tsuba were more for functionality than for decoration, being made of stronger metals and designs. During the Edo period (1603–1868) there was peace in Japan so tsuba became more ornamental and made of less practical metals such as gold.

Tsuba are usually finely decorated, and nowadays are collectors' items.  Tsuba were made by whole dynasties of craftsmen whose only craft was making tsuba. They were usually lavishly decorated. In addition to being collectors items, they were often used as heirlooms, passed from one generation to the next.  Japanese families with samurai roots sometimes have their family crest (mon) crafted onto a tsuba. Tsuba can be found in a variety of metals and alloys, including iron, steel, brass, copper and shakudō.
In a duel, two participants may lock their katana together at the point of the tsuba and push, trying to gain a better position from which to strike the other down. This is known as tsubazeriai (鍔迫り合い), lit. pushing tsuba against each other. Tsubazeriai is a common sight in modern kendō.

In modern Japanese, tsubazeriai (鍔迫り合い) has also come to mean "to be in fierce competition."

Seppa 
The seppa (切羽) are washers used in front of and behind the tsuba to tighten the fittings. Seppa can be ornate or plain.

Habaki 
The  is a piece of metal encircling the base of the blade of a Japanese sword. It has the double purpose of locking the tsuba (guard) in place, and to maintain the weapon in its saya (scabbard).

The importance of the habaki is seen in drawing the katana from the scabbard. It is drawn by grasping the scabbard near the top and pressing the guard with the thumb to emerge the blade just enough to unwedge the habaki from inside the scabbard in a process called . The blade, being freed, can be drawn out very quickly. This is obviously an extremely aggressive gesture, since a fatal cut can be given in a fraction of a second thereafter (see iaidō). It is similar in connotation and effect as drawing back the hammer of a handgun, chambering a round on a pump-action shotgun, or pulling back and releasing the charging handle on other firearms.

The expression "tanka o kiru" is now widely used in Japan, in the sense of "getting ready to begin something", or "getting ready to speak", especially with an aggressive connotation.

The habaki will cause normal wear and tear inside the scabbard, and either a shim or a total replacement of the scabbard may be needed to remedy the issue as it will become too loose over time. Removing the habaki and oiling it after cutting or once every few months is recommended.

See also 
List of National Treasures of Japan (crafts-swords)
Tsuba in the collection of Wolverhampton Art Gallery, England

Notes

References

Further reading 
 The Craft of the Japanese Sword, Leon and Hiroko Kapp, Yoshindo Yoshihara ; Kodansha International; 
 The Samurai Sword: A Handbook, John M. Yumoto ; Charles E. Tuttle Company; 
 The Japanese Sword, Kanzan Sato ; Kodansha International; 
 Japanese Swords, Nobuo Ogasawara ; Hoikusha Publishing Co, Ltd.

External links 

 History of the Development of Koshirae
 Habaki – On Japanese Swords
Martial Arts Weapons and Training – The Sageo and How to Wear Your Katana
 Nihonto Antiques – Step by step guide to tying a Sageo (photos).
 Usagiya Sword Shop – Step by step guide to tying a Sageo (photos).
TakumiWarrior Sword Shop – Exploration of Japanese Tsuba Designs (photos).

Mountings
Samurai weapons and equipment